Odell Jones (born January 13, 1953 in Tulare, California) is a former pitcher in Major League Baseball who played for the Pittsburgh Pirates, Seattle Mariners, Texas Rangers, Baltimore Orioles and Milwaukee Brewers, in parts of nine seasons spanning 1975–1988.

Career

Journeyman career
Overall, Jones' professional baseball career spanned 21 seasons. He made his major league debut for the  NL East division-winning Pirates, appearing in two September games. He was traded along with Mario Mendoza and Rafael Vásquez from the Pirates to the Mariners for Enrique Romo, Tom McMillan and Rick Jones at the Winter Meetings on December 5, 1978. The Pirates then traded for him a year later. After that, he drifted through several organizations, never going more than two seasons without spending time in the minor leagues.

Saves Leader
Jones led the third place 1983 Texas Rangers in saves with 10.

An unlikely near no-hitter
One of Jones' most memorable games came on May 28, 1988, with the Milwaukee Brewers. Jones, who had not started a major league game since 1981, started against the Cleveland Indians in place of the injured Teddy Higuera. In Higuera's previous start, he had lasted just one inning, and Jones pitched 5 innings in relief, giving up just 2 hits and one run. Surprisingly, Jones came within two outs of a no-hitter before giving up a single to Ron Washington and being pulled for closer Dan Plesac.

The game, which took place in Cleveland Municipal Stadium, was the best of his career. Jones, who had been pitching in the minor leagues with the Syracuse Chiefs the previous year, never pitched a complete-game shutout, and in fact never gave up fewer than five hits in any of his four career complete games. "I kind of looked up at the board tonight and thought, 'What am I doing? What in the world am I doing?' This is by far my best game ever," Jones told reporters after the game. "After about the fifth or sixth inning, I was really bearing down, trying to get it. After the hit, it really hit me hard, I was totally exhausted. I was overextending myself, using everything I had to get the ball up there. I was too tired to get nervous."

In his next start, Jones lasted just 4 innings, giving up 4 runs and 5 hits. He never made another major league start after that, and in 1989 he returned to the minor leagues with the Brewers' top farm club, the Denver Bears. That winter, Jones joined the Senior Professional Baseball Association, where he pitched for the West Palm Beach Tropics and Fort Myers Sun Sox during that league's two seasons.

Career overview
In nine major league seasons, Jones had a 24–35 win–loss record, with a 4.42 ERA. He appeared in 201 games, with 549⅓ innings pitched. He started 45 games, in which he had four complete games. As a reliever, he finished 91 games, including 13 saves.

Notes

Sources
, or Retrosheet, or Venezuelan Winter League

1953 births
Living people
Acereros de Monclova players
African-American baseball players
American expatriate baseball players in Canada
American expatriate baseball players in Mexico
Águilas Cibaeñas players
American expatriate baseball players in the Dominican Republic
Baltimore Orioles players
Baseball players from California
Charleston Charlies players
Charleston Pirates players
Columbus Clippers players
Denver Zephyrs players
Edmonton Trappers players
Fort Myers Sun Sox players
Industriales de Monterrey players
Major League Baseball pitchers
Mexican League baseball pitchers
Milwaukee Brewers players
Niagara Falls Pirates players
Olmecas de Tabasco players
People from Tulare, California
Pittsburgh Pirates players
Portland Beavers players
Rochester Red Wings players
Salem Pirates players
Seattle Mariners players
Syracuse Chiefs players
Texas Rangers players
Tiburones de La Guaira players
American expatriate baseball players in Venezuela
Thetford Mines Pirates players
West Palm Beach Tropics players
21st-century African-American people
20th-century African-American sportspeople
Compton High School alumni